World on Fire is the second studio album billed to the American band Slash featuring Myles Kennedy and the Conspirators, consisting of Guns N' Roses guitarist Slash and his backup band, released on September 10, 2014; it also acts as Slash's third solo album.

The album was written by Slash and Myles Kennedy while on the road, and produced by Michael "Elvis" Baskette. Kennedy had focused on rhythm guitar and vocals on Apocalyptic Love, but due to his touring with Alter Bridge he worked only on vocals for World on Fire. Returning members Todd Kerns and Brent Fitz played bass and drums, respectively, on the album. The album was given a limited edition box set release which included a T-shirt and a new lenticular album cover.

Reception

World on Fire received generally positive reviews from critics.
AllMusic stated: "Everything hovers around the 'pretty good' mark: Slash, naturally, stands out and his solos are nearly as pleasurable as his riffs, the Conspirators hit their marks with aplomb, as does Myles Kennedy, who never gets in the way of songs, not even ones he's written. As this train barrels on, there's the sense that the record never really started and will never really end, but such full-throttle indulgence may indeed be what some fans want, for there is a whole lot of bang for this buck."

Track listing

Personnel
Slash featuring Myles Kennedy and the Conspirators
Slash – lead guitar, rhythm guitar, slide guitar, six-string bass, 12-string guitar
Myles Kennedy – lead vocals
Todd Kerns – bass, acoustic guitar, backing vocals
Brent Fitz – drums, percussion, electric piano

Production personnel
Michael "Elvis" Baskette – producer, mixing, engineer
Jef Moll – engineer
Ron English – artwork
Ted Jensen – mastering engineer

Commercial performance
World on Fire entered the Billboard 200 at number ten, selling 29,000 album-equivalent units in its first week of release. In the second week, the album dropped down 71 percent to No. 37 on the chart, selling 8,250 copies. The album went on to sell another 4,950 album-equivalent units in the third week on the Billboard 200 album chart, dropping 42 percent to No. 66. As of January 21, 2015, World on Fire had sold more than 80,000 copies in the United States. In Canada, the album peaked at number four on the Canadian Albums Chart, selling 5,300 copies in its first week of release. In the United Kingdom, the release peaked at No. 7 and was certified Silver by the British Phonographic Industry for more than 60,000 sales on August 18, 2017.

Charts and certifications

Weekly charts

Year-end charts

Certifications

Release history

References

2014 albums
Slash (musician) albums
Albums produced by Michael Baskette